Cabruta is a Venezuelan fishing town on the Orinoco river in Las Mercedes Municipality, Guárico State, site of a Jesuit mission, and the site of a proposed bridge across the Orinoco to Caicara, Bolívar State.

History
In 1531 by Diego de Ordaz mentioned the indigenous village there, with the name 'Cabritu'. In 1556, Martin Lopez mentioned that it was an Arawak village with the name 'Caburute'. The 17th century saw a number of plans to fortify Cabruta, and in 1643 Juan de Ochoa Gresala y Aguirre was authorized to establish a Spanish port and found a city to be called 'Triunfo de la Cruz y Nueva Cantabria'. However, it was not until 1647 that Miguel de Ochogavia y Jacinto de Carvajal actually arrived, coming down the Apure River, and with the help of chief Maguare began the improvements. Just eleven years later (1658) the Spanish left Cabruta. It wasn't until 1720 that two capuchine missionaries, formerly with the gold-seeking expedition of Marcos de Castro, settled there and their mission was approved in 1722, but then abandoned to be taken up by the Jesuit Bernardo Rotella in 1733.

Economy 
There was a fish processing and freezing center in Cabruta, which closed in 1998. Cotton is grown in the surrounding area and a textile processing plant has been proposed. The Venezuelan government has also proposed building an oil refinery there.

Geography 
Cabruta is located near the geographical center of Venezuela. This was one of the reasons that proposals were made for constructing a planned city as a new capital for Venezuela near Cabruta. These proposals were made and abandoned in the 1970s.

Local Geography 
Several hills surround the vicinity of Cabruta. These are

 Cerro Cabruta, a 200m hill 1.74 km (1.08 miles) west of Cabruta.
 Cerro Caribe, a 126m hill 3.46 km (2.14 miles) northwest of Cabruta.

Transport 

In 2006, a railway to Cabruta was commenced, but the project is on hold, as is Puente Mercosur, the associated bridge across the Orinoco for road and rail, which has been planned as the third crossing of this river.

See also 

 Railway stations in Venezuela

References

External links 
  in Spanish
 Press release (10 July 2006) "Pescadores de Cabruta fueron capacitados en cultivos piscícolas" Instituto Nacional Investigaciones Agricolas, "Cabruta fishermen learn fish farming" in Spanish
 Press release (August 8, 2006) "PDVSA to build three new refineries in Venezuela", World Energy News Item 76895

Populated places in Guárico